Eupithecia indigata, the ochreous pug, is a moth of the family Geometridae. The species can be found in Europe.
and across the Palearctic as far as the Altai mountains It primarily colonizes pine forests, mixed pine forests and pine plantations. In the Alps it rises to heights of 1800 metres.

The wingspan is 15–18 mm. The length of the forewings is 8–10 mm. 
The ground colour of the forewings is pale ochreous brown. The crosslines are fine and indistinct and there is series of small darker dusky marks along the costa. There is a small black discal spot. The hindwings are pale becoming darker towards the outer margin. Identification requires examination of the genitalia.<ref>Riley, A.M. & Prior, G., 2003, British and Irish pug moths, Harley Books, </ref> See also Prout.

The larva is naked, bright greenish brown, with a light reddish-brown dorsal line and yellowish side stripes. The back of the head and the anus flap are dark brown. The light brown pupa has dark brown wing sheaths. There are eight equally long hook bristles on the cremaster.

The moths fly in one generation from April to May.

The caterpillars feed on Pinus sylvestris and Larix''.

References

External links
Ochreous pug on UKmoths
Lepidoptera of Belgium
Lepiforum.de
Vlindernet.nl 

Moths described in 1813
indigata
Moths of Europe
Taxa named by Jacob Hübner